The 2022–23 season is the 130th in the history of AC Sparta Prague and their 30th consecutive season in the top flight. The club will participate in the Czech First League, the Czech Cup, and the UEFA Europa Conference League.

Players

Out on loan

Other players under contract

Pre-season and friendlies

Competitions

Overall record

Czech First League

League table

Results summary

Results by round

Matches 
The league fixtures were announced on 22 June 2022.

Czech Cup

UEFA Europa Conference League

Second qualifying round 
The draw for the second qualifying round was made on 15 June 2022.

References

AC Sparta Prague seasons
Sparta Prague